Prabodh Raval was a leader of Indian National Congress from Gujarat and served as Home minister in Solanki government from 1980 to 85. He was The President Of Gujarat Pradesh Congress Committee for two terms.

References

1999 deaths
1929 births
State cabinet ministers of Gujarat
Gujarat MLAs 1980–1985
Indian National Congress politicians
Indian National Congress politicians from Gujarat